Bausch is a German surname. Notable people with the surname include:

Andy Bausch (born 1959), Luxembourgish cinematographer and director
Dotsie Bausch (born 1973), American cyclist
François Bausch (born 1956), Luxembourgish  politician, member of the Chamber of Deputies
Frank Bausch (1908–1976), American professional football player
James Bausch (a.k.a. Jarring Jim) (1906–1974), American Olympic decathlete
John Jacob Bausch (1830–1926), German-American optician who co-founded Bausch & Lomb
Ludwig Bausch (1805–1871), German bow (stringed instruments) maker
Pina Bausch (1940–2009), German modern-dance choreographer
Richard Bausch (born 1945), American author
Robert Bausch (1945–2018), American author and professor of English

See also
Bausch & Lomb, an American manufacturer of contact lenses and eye-care products

German-language surnames